This is Craig Brown is a book by British satirist, Craig Brown.

Books by Craig Brown (satirist)
2004 non-fiction books
Ebury Publishing books